Tentsmuir Forest is in north east Fife, Scotland. The forest consists mainly of Scots pine and Corsican pine, and is now owned by Forestry and Land Scotland, successor body to the Forestry Commission.

Three parts of the area, Morton Lochs, Tentsmuir Point and Tayport Heath are managed by NatureScot, and are now designated as Tentsmuir National Nature Reserve, with Tentsmuir Forest covering most of the land between the three portions of the NNR.

Tentsmuir is notable for the many concrete blocks known as 'Dragon's Teeth' distributed along the shoreline, which acted as coastal defence against landing craft during World War II. The nearby Leuchars Station means that military aircraft are often seen (and heard), but aviation links go back to 1911 with the setting up of a Royal Engineers training camp. During World War II, troops of the Polish Army were based here to staff the coastal defences.

Also of interest is a 19th-century icehouse, historically used to store salmon but now an important artificial bat roost.

See also
Tentsmuir National Nature Reserve

References

External links

Protected areas of Fife
Environment of North East Fife
Scottish coast
Forests and woodlands of Scotland